Behdad Sami (born June 20, 1986) is an Iranian American professional basketball player. Behdad was the world's first Iranian basketball player to play professionally at any level in the United States when he played in the minor-league American Basketball Association in 2007. In October 2010, he became the first Iranian to play pro basketball in Portugal.

High School and College
Behdad graduated from Southridge High School in 2005. Prior to graduating from Southridge, Sami attended Lake Oswego High School for two years, but due to complications between him and the varsity head coach, he later decided to transfer. Sami's transfer was a result of one specific incident, where the varsity head coach referred to him as "Osama bin Laden" during practice. Upon graduating, Behdad received a full ride athletic scholarship to Linn-Benton Community College in Albany, Oregon where he played one season in the Northwest Athletic Association of Community Colleges (NWAACC) prior to turning pro.

Professional career
Behdad started his professional career playing point guard for the Georgia Gwizzlies in the American Basketball Association (ABA) & also professionally overseas. Standing at six feet with only a 7-foot 4 vertical arm reach, his dunking vertical leap is measured at 46" and has a 40-yard dash time of 4.469 seconds. In SAQ (speed, agility, quickness) tests done in December 2008, he managed to touch a 10-foot 9-inch  mark on a concrete surfaced facility. Sami has played in many different countries and different leagues around the world, including major-league professional teams in Iran and Qatar. Behdad started the 2010 season with the San Diego Surf (ABA) but within the first month of the season was signed to play with the Guifoes Sport Club in Portugal's ProLiga. Following his season in Portugal, Sami received results indicating he had played his season in Portugal on a broken shin. Due to this injury, he has been forced to sit out the entire 2011-2013 season, and undergo rigorous physical therapy.

Gatorade - Quest for G; The series
In spring of 2009, Behdad was hand-picked from thousands of top athletes around the world to be a part of Gatorade "Quest for G; The Series". This was a reality show about training athletes, and turning them into Olympic ready athletes for their specific individual sport. Although Sami was selected for his accomplishments and athletic ability in basketball, due to the concept of individual sports, Sami, with the approval of Gatorade decided to attempt their trials for tennis because of his strong background in that sport.

Off The Court

Personal life
Behdad was an actor in the film production of The Winner, which released Winter of 2012. In May 2011, Sami posed for the NOH8 photo campaign, showing his support to the silenced men and women around the world. Behdad was co-owner and co-founder of KTJB Presents production company. In May 2012, KTJB released its first stop-animation official music video for rapper David Banner, which featured singer Chris Brown.

Behdad Sami Interactive
In 2014, he founded Behdad Sami Interactive which focuses on video games, apps, and entertainment. Get 'Em was the first video game title he created and released in 2016 for the Apple iOS and Android platforms. Behdad wrote, produced, and directed Get 'Em, as well as created the music and was a voice actor in the game. On October 19, 2017, Behdad wrote, designed, and published the Get 'Em children's graphic novel, on iBooks. On June 21, 2018, Behdad Sami Interactive released the Get 'Em iMessage stickers app. The stickers' app has artwork from the actual video game and graphic novel iBook.

Sponsors
In February 2011, Behdad received his first sponsorship deal from Kallusive Clothing (which no longer exists). Behdad was also endorsed by O.N.E Coconut Water, which started their sponsorship in August 2011. He was an ambassador of the "Liquid Revolution" which promotes and encourages people to live a healthy lifestyle.

References

1986 births
Living people
Iranian expatriate basketball people in the United States
Iranian men's basketball players
Point guards
American people of Iranian descent
Sportspeople from Beaverton, Oregon
Basketball players from Portland, Oregon
American music video directors
Southridge High School (Beaverton, Oregon) alumni
Lake Oswego High School alumni
Video game developers
Video game publishers
Indie video game developers
Iranian people in the video game industry
Video game designers
Male video game actors
Video game directors
Video game musicians
Video game writers
Video game producers
Comics publishing companies
Iranian children's writers
American children's writers
Sportspeople of Iranian descent